Rumsey Hall can refer to:

Rumsey Hall School
Rumsey Hall (Cornwall, Connecticut), one of the school's early buildings, now demolished
Rumsey Hall (Shepherdstown, West Virginia)